Hotel Hadley is a historic hotel building located at Siler City, Chatham County, North Carolina. It was built in 1907, and is two-story brick building with elaborate eclectic Victorian design elements.  It served as the city's most desirable hotel and as Hadley's residence into the 1940s.

It was listed on the National Register of Historic Places in 1985. It is located in the Siler City Commercial Historic District.

References

Hotel buildings on the National Register of Historic Places in North Carolina
Victorian architecture in North Carolina
Hotel buildings completed in 1907
Buildings and structures in Chatham County, North Carolina
National Register of Historic Places in Chatham County, North Carolina
Historic district contributing properties in North Carolina